The 1909–10 season was the seventh competitive season in the history of Plymouth Argyle Football Club.

References
General

Specific

External links
Plymouth Argyle F.C. official website
Plymouth Argyle F.C. archive

1909-10
English football clubs 1909–10 season